Abunuabunu is a local soup of the people from the Brong Ahafo Region of Ghana. It is made from cocoyam  leaves (locally called kontomire) together with other ingredients (tomatoes, snails, smoked fish, onions, green pepper, turkey berries (Asante - twi kwahu nsusua) and salt).

Mode of serving 
Abunuabunu  is commonly found and prepared among people in Kumasi. It is mostly served with fufu or banku but it can be equally served with anything of your choice.

Ingredients 

 Snails
 Smoked fish
 Mushrooms
 Koobi (salted dry tilapia)
 10-15 medium size cocoyam leaves (Kontomire)
 Handful of kwansesaawa (Turkey berries)
 Vegetables (onion, green pepper, tomatoes, ginger, garlic)
 Salt
dried fish
dawawa

Method of preparation 

 Prepare snails with lemon juice.
 Cut mushroom and koobi (salted fish) into pieces and place them in a big saucepan
 Add snails
 Steam the mix with seasoning, salt and blended ginger, onion and garlic.
 Wash and add fresh tomatoes and onion, then cover the saucepan.
 Plug stalks from the cocoyam leaves and carefully wash.
 Put leaves in a saucepan and add water pepper and kwansesaawa and cover to boil for 5 – 8 minutes.
 Remove tomatoes and onion from the soup and grind if its well cooked.
 Strain through a colander and add to the soup.
 Wash smoked fish and add to the soup
 Cover to boil for 5 minutes.
 Grind leaves, pepper and kwansesaawa thoroughly and add to soup.
 Add more water depending on the thickens you want.
 Taste and add salt.
 Lower temperature and leave to boil for another 6 to 10 minutes
 Serve soup with fufu, riceballs or anything of your choice.

See also 

 Ghanaian Cuisine

External links 
 Video: Let's make Ebunuebunu 
 Video:How to prepare Abunubunu

References 

Brong-Ahafo Region
Ghanaian cuisine
African soups